Missan is a Union council of Tando Allahyar District in Sindh, Pakistan. It is one of the largest Union Councils of the District, with a population of 13,114.

References

Union councils of Sindh
Tando Allahyar District